The 2017 Eastern Kentucky Colonels football team represented Eastern Kentucky University during the 2017 NCAA Division I FCS football season. They were led by second-year head coach Mark Elder and played their home games at Roy Kidd Stadium. They were a member of the Ohio Valley Conference. They finished the season 4–7, 3–5 in OVC play to finish in a tie for fifth place.

Schedule

References

Eastern Kentucky
Eastern Kentucky Colonels football seasons
Eastern Kentucky Colonels football